Rashidpur may refer to:

Places
 Rashidpur, Raebareli, a village in Uttar Pradesh, India
 Rashidpur Garhi, a census town in Uttar Pradesh, India
 Rashidpur Gas Field, a gas field in Bangladesh
 Rashid Pur Altabari, a village in Bihar, India